Walter Hartwell White Sr., also known by his alias Heisenberg, is a fictional character and the protagonist of the American crime drama television series Breaking Bad, portrayed by Bryan Cranston. 

Walter was a skilled chemist and co-founder of a technology firm before he accepted a buy-out from his partners. Walt became a high-school chemistry teacher in Albuquerque, and barely 
making ends meet with his family with wife Skyler (Anna Gunn) and son Walt Jr. (RJ Mitte). At the start of the series, the day after his 50th birthday, Walt is diagnosed with Stage III lung cancer. After this discovery, Walt resorts to manufacturing and selling methamphetamine with a former student, Jesse Pinkman (Aaron Paul), to ensure his family's financial security after his death. Due to his chemistry training and production route, Walt's "blue meth" is purer than any other on the market, and he is pulled deeper into the illicit drug trade. 

Walt becomes increasingly ruthless as the series progresses, and later adopts the alias "Heisenberg", which becomes recognizable as a kingpin figure in the Southwestern drug trade. Walt struggles with managing his family while hiding his involvement in the drug business from his brother-in-law and DEA agent Hank Schrader (Dean Norris). Walt becomes less sympathetic throughout the show, as series creator Vince Gilligan wanted him to turn from "Mr. Chips into Scarface". Although AMC officials initially hesitated to cast Cranston due to his previous comedic role on Malcolm in the Middle, Gilligan cast him based on the actor's past performance in The X-Files episode "Drive", which Gilligan wrote. Cranston contributed greatly to the creation of his character, including Walt's backstory, personality, and physical appearance.

One of the most iconic characters in popular culture, Walter White has been listed among the greatest villains and fictional characters ever created. Both the character and Cranston's performance have received critical acclaim, with White frequently being mentioned as one of the greatest and most iconic television characters of all time.  Cranston won four Primetime Emmy Awards for Outstanding Lead Actor in a Drama Series, three of them being consecutive. He is the first man to win a Critics' Choice, Golden Globe, Primetime Emmy, and Screen Actors Guild Award for his performance. Cranston reprised the role of Walt in a flashback for Breaking Bads sequel film El Camino, and again in the sixth and final season of the prequel series Better Call Saul, making him one of the few characters to appear in all three, alongside Jesse Pinkman, Mike Ehrmantraut (Jonathan Banks), Ed Galbraith (Robert Forster), and Austin Ramey (Todd Terry).

Concept and creation 

Inspired by Tony Soprano, Breaking Bad creator Vince Gilligan had wanted his lead character to be a protagonist that turned into an antagonist over the course of the show, or as he described, turning Mr. Chips into Scarface. Gilligan also said, in 2013, "Without Tony Soprano, there would be no Walter White." Gilligan needed to have this character come into a midlife crisis that would put him into seeking risky options and lead to more criminal activities. As the premise of Breaking Bad was based on a humorous idea that he and his fellow writer from The X-Files, Thomas Schnauz had come up with of driving around in an RV making methamphetamine, Gilligan made Walter a chemistry teacher, one who, until the start of the show, would have never violated the law.

Gilligan cast Bryan Cranston for the role of Walter White based on having worked with him in "Drive", a sixth season episode of the science fiction television series The X-Files, where Gilligan worked as a writer. Cranston played an antisemite with a terminal illness who took Fox Mulder (David Duchovny) hostage. Gilligan said the character had to be simultaneously loathsome and sympathetic, and that "Bryan alone was the only actor who could do that, who could pull off that trick. And it is a trick. I have no idea how he does it." AMC officials were initially reluctant with the casting choice, having known Cranston only as the over-the-top character Hal on the comedy series Malcolm in the Middle and approached actors John Cusack and Matthew Broderick about the role. When both actors declined, the executives were persuaded to cast Cranston after seeing the X-Files episode.

Cranston contributed a great deal to the character's persona. When Gilligan left much of Walter's past unexplained during the development of the series, the actor wrote his own backstory for the character. At the start of the show, Cranston gained 10 pounds to presage the character's gradual physical deterioration. He had the natural red highlights of his hair dyed brown. He collaborated with costume designer Kathleen Detoro on a wardrobe of mostly neutral green and brown colors to make the character bland and unremarkable, and worked with makeup artist Frieda Valenzuela to create a mustache he described as "impotent" and like a "dead caterpillar". Cranston also repeatedly identified elements in scripts where he disagreed with how the character was handled, and would go so far as to call Gilligan directly when he could not work out disagreements with the episode's screenwriter(s). Cranston has said he was inspired partially by his father for how Walt carries himself physically, which he described as "a little hunched over, never erect, [as if] the weight of the world is on this man's shoulders".

Gilligan has said it has been difficult to write for Walter White because the character is so dark and morally questionable. As the series progressed, Gilligan and the writing staff of Breaking Bad made Walt increasingly unsympathetic. Cranston said by the fourth season: "I think Walt's figured out it's better to be a pursuer than the pursued. He's well on his way to badass." Regarding White's fate in the series ending, Cranston foresaw it as "ugly [with no] redemption", although earlier, Gilligan divulged his plans to "end on a high note, in a way that will satisfy everyone".

Character biography

Background 
When Walter White was six years old, his father died of Huntington's disease. He studied chemistry at California Institute of Technology and, after graduate school, worked as a researcher at Los Alamos National Laboratory. There he conducted research on proton radiography, that helped a team win a Nobel Prize in Chemistry in 1985.  Using some of the prize money, Walt then founded the firm Gray Matter Technologies with Elliott Schwartz (Adam Godley), his former classmate and close friend. Around this time, Walt dated his lab assistant, Gretchen Schwartz (Jessica Hecht). He left both Gretchen and Gray Matter Technologies, selling his financial interest in the company for $5,000. Gretchen and Elliott later married and made a fortune, much of it from Walt's research. Though they remain friendly, Walt secretly resents both Gretchen and Elliott for profiting from his work.

At the age of 50, Walt works as a high school chemistry teacher in Albuquerque, New Mexico, providing instruction to uninterested and disrespectful students. Walt also has another job at a local car wash to supplement his income, which proves to be particularly humiliating when he has to clean the cars of his own students. Walt and his wife Skyler (Anna Gunn) have a teenage son named Walter Jr. (RJ Mitte), who has cerebral palsy. Skyler is also pregnant with their second child, Holly, who is born at the end of season two. Walt's other family includes Skyler's sister, Marie Schrader (Betsy Brandt); her husband, Hank (Dean Norris), who is a DEA agent; and his mother, who is never seen.

Appearances 
The following appearances are based on the chronological narrative in Breaking Bad. Scenes from Better Call Saul fit into this chronology and are denoted appropriately.

Season 1 

On his 50th birthday, during his surprise party, Walt watches a news report about Hank arresting methamphetamine dealers. Walt is impressed by the monetary returns from the meth operation, and Hank offers to take him as a ride-along to a DEA bust. The next day, Walt faints at the car wash and is taken to a hospital; there, he is told he has inoperable lung cancer and will likely die within the next two years. During the ride-along, Hank busts a crystal meth lab, taking cook Emilio Koyama (John Koyama) into custody. Walt sees Emilio's partner fleeing the scene, and realizes it is one of his former students, Jesse Pinkman (Aaron Paul). Looking to secure his family's well-being by producing and selling meth, Walt tracks Jesse down and blackmails him into selling the meth that Walt will cook. Walt gives Jesse his life savings to buy an RV that they can use as a rolling meth lab.

After their first cook in the RV, Jesse brings a sample of the extremely pure meth to distributor Domingo "Krazy-8" Molina (Max Arciniega) and then brings Krazy-8 and the now-released Emilio to see the cook site. Emilio recognizes Walt as accompanying the DEA during the bust and believes he is an informant. Krazy-8 forces Walt to show them how he cooked such pure meth or risk being killed. Walt pretends to start a cook but instead produces toxic phosphine gas which kills Emilio and incapacitates Krazy-8. Walt and Jesse secure Krazy-8 to a structural post in Jesse's basement with a U-lock around his neck, and Walt struggles with the decision on whether to kill him. After Krazy-8 promises not to retaliate, Walt starts to unlock the lock to let Krazy-8 go but sees him reach for a broken piece of plate to stab Walt with as soon as he is freed. Walt panics and garrotes him to death with the lock. The experience shakes Walt, and he tells Jesse he will not cook meth anymore.

Walt eventually tells his family about his cancer diagnosis, and they urge him to undergo expensive chemotherapy. He initially does not want to go through the treatment, fearing that his family will remember him as a burden and a helpless invalid, much as he remembers his own father. Later he reluctantly agrees to undergo treatment but refuses Gretchen and Elliott's offer to pay for it, choosing to re-enter the drug trade with Jesse. He shaves his head to hide his chemotherapy-induced hair loss.

Dissatisfied with Jesse's slow pace of selling the meth, Walt pushes him to sell it in bulk to local drug lord Tuco Salamanca (Raymond Cruz), who has taken over Krazy-8's former territory. Discovering that Tuco stole the meth and savagely beat Jesse, Walt visits Tuco's lair with another bag of crystals, claiming to be "Heisenberg" (a reference to the theoretical physicist Werner Karl Heisenberg). After Tuco mocks Jesse, refuses to pay for the bag, and implies that Walt will suffer the same fate as Jesse, Walt blows up part of the lair; the bag contained fulminated mercury, not meth. Impressed by the boldness of "Heisenberg", Tuco reluctantly agrees to pay for his meth upon delivery in the future.

Walt revels in his success and adopts the Heisenberg alias in his business dealings going forward.  In order to make larger batches of meth to take advantage of their new arrangement with Tuco, Walt and Jesse switch from using pseudoephedrine to methylamine as a precursor. This tints their meth blue, which becomes a signature of Walt's product. The pair begin to fear for their lives when, after testing the purity of the meth they delivered by snorting some of it, Tuco senselessly beats to death one of his own men, No-Doze (Cesar Garcia).

Season 2 

Walt's "blue meth" becomes incredibly popular, to the point that Hank takes notice and raids Tuco's operation. A paranoid Tuco evades the bust, carjacks Jesse, and kidnaps Walt. He brings them to an isolated house in the desert, planning to take them deep into Mexico where they would be forced to cook their blue meth for the cartel. After a failed attempt to poison Tuco, they manage to escape on foot. Hank, who had been searching for Jesse, spots his car at the house and kills Tuco in a gunfight. Walt is arrested when he takes off all his clothes in a grocery store. He explains his disappearance by claiming that he had gone into a fugue state as a result of his cancer medication and simply wandered off.

Walt finds out that his cancer is in remission, and plans to leave the meth business again after selling the final 38 lb (17 kg) of meth. He hires unscrupulous criminal attorney Saul Goodman (Bob Odenkirk) to cover his involvement in the drug trade and launder his drug money. The Better Call Saul episode "Breaking Bad" expands on Walt and Saul's first meeting where Saul quickly deduces Walt is Heisenberg and urges Walt to seek higher goals with his meth business. Saul also has his cleaner, Mike Ehrmantraut (Jonathan Banks), investigate Walt's background, and despite Mike's cautions, Saul continues to support Walt.

Seeing they need a new distributor to sell the large quantity of product they have remaining, Saul arranges a meeting at a local restaurant with a mysterious meth kingpin. Jesse shows up for the meeting high on heroin, and leaves when the kingpin does not show. Walt realizes that the restaurant owner, Gus Fring (Giancarlo Esposito) was the man they were supposed to meet. Under questioning by Walt, Gus explains that he was observing the pair, and refuses to work with them because Jesse is a drug addict. However, a few days later he gives Walt a chance to prove himself by delivering all the meth to a truck stop within an hour. Walt breaks into Jesse's apartment where the meth is stored and finds him passed out with his girlfriend Jane Margolis (Krysten Ritter).  Walt finds the meth and makes the delivery on time, but misses the birth of his daughter. Jane blackmails Walt into giving Jesse his share of their drug money after Walt initially refused due to Jesse's drug use.

After talking to a stranger at a bar about family – not knowing that the man is Jane's father Donald (John de Lancie) – Walt again breaks into Jesse's apartment to find the lovers passed out in a heroin stupor. Walt attempts to wake Jesse and inadvertently rolls Jane onto her back; she subsequently vomits and begins to choke. Walt does nothing to help her and watches her die. Walt has Mike clear any connection Jesse has to Jane's death, and convinces Jesse to enter rehab.

Walt undergoes an operation to remove the remaining cancerous growth. Walt's anesthesia-induced references to a "second cell phone" – the one he uses to deal drugs – makes Skyler suspicious, leading her to uncover many of his lies and leave with their children. Just after her departure, two passenger planes collide directly above Walt's house; the accident was caused by Donald, who works as an air traffic controller and was so overcome with grief that he was not paying attention to his work. Walt watches the accident in horror, unaware that he is indirectly responsible for it.

Season 3 

Walt decides to get out of the meth business, refusing Gus' offer to produce meth in a state-of-the-art laboratory hidden under an industrial laundry for a million dollars a month. Now separated from Skyler and living in an apartment, Walt admits to her that he has been financing his treatment by cooking meth. Horrified, Skyler asks for a divorce in return for her silence and demands that Walt have nothing to do with their children.

After he discovers Jesse is cooking and selling his own version of the blue meth, Walt agrees to cook his meth for Gus. He is assisted by accomplished chemist Gale Boetticher (David Costabile) and the business begins running smoothly. Jesse continues to cook his own version of the blue meth, with Skinny Pete and Badger as his distributors, but this leads to Hank nearly catching Jesse and Walt while following a lead on an RV he believed was being used to cook meth. To avoid being discovered hiding in the RV, Walt and Jesse, aided by Saul, place a phone call to distract Hank, making him believe his wife Marie has suffered a car accident. Hank decides to leave the pursuit of the RV only to find out that Marie is fine, allowing Walt and Jesse to dispose of the vehicle. This enrages Hank enough to badly beat up Jesse at his house and send him to the hospital.  Walter apologizes to Jesse for Hank’s beating while Jesse is planning to sue Hank. Walt advises him to leave the meth business for good, but Jesse tells Walt that he’ll continue to cook meth on his own. He also tells Walt that if he's caught, he would make a deal to give up Heisenberg. Fearing that any of this will derail Hank's career in law enforcement, Walt is forced to convince Gus to hire Jesse to replace Gale as his assistant, agreeing to share 50% of his earnings with Jesse. Jesse is reluctant to work with Walter again, stating that ever since they became associates, Jesse has felt more alone than ever. Walter tells Jesse that he is as good as him cooking meth. Jesse finally agrees to partner with Walt once more, to which Walt sighs in relief, even though this will cost him $1,500,000. Walter awkwardly fires Gale from the lab and gives Jesse the assistant’s job and tells Victor that the change is for the best. Victor reminds Walt that they have to meet the 200 pounds-a-week quota.

Assuming that Skyler will not turn him in to the police due to the harm it would cause to their son, Walt returns to his house. After a few attempts at bluffing him, Skyler comes to uneasily accept the situation and helps Walt launder his drug money, but refuses to have anything to do with him outside of business. The rift in their marriage worsens when Skyler sleeps with her boss, Ted Beneke (Christopher Cousins). Walt attempts to get back at her by making a pass at the principal at his school, who puts him on indefinite suspension.

Tuco's cousins Marco and Leonel Salamanca (Luis and Daniel Moncada) seek revenge against those responsible for his death and find out Walt's identity from their uncle Hector Salamanca (Mark Margolis). Believing that Walt betrayed Tuco, they go to his house and prepare to kill him with a silver axe. Gus discovers this, and to protect his investment in Walt, he convinces them to instead target Hank, who actually killed Tuco. Later, the cousins die in their attempt to take Hank's life but manage to temporarily paralyze him from the waist down. Skyler forces Walt into paying for Hank's care and creates a cover story about Walt counting cards at casinos to explain how he made his money.

Walt angers Gus by killing two of Gus' dealers in an attempt to protect Jesse, who had been planning to kill them himself for their murder of a child gang member. Gus responds by putting a hit on Jesse and re-hiring Gale as Walt's assistant, with the intention of replacing Walt as soon as possible. Walt plots to kill Gale to avoid becoming disposable, but Gus' henchman Victor lures Walt to the laundry facility, where Mike is waiting to kill him. Walt frantically calls Jesse and tells him that he is about to be killed and Jesse will have to take out Gale himself. Victor rushes to Gale's house but finds him shot dead.

Season 4 

In the aftermath of Gale's murder, Mike holds Walt at the lab to await Gus' arrival. Victor arrives with Jesse and proceeds to start the cooking process himself to show Gus that Walt and Jesse are not indispensable. Gus, however, kills Victor in front of Mike, Walt, and Jesse in a gruesome show of force. The tension of working under tighter security creates a rift between Walt and Jesse, and Gus uses the opportunity to bring Jesse to his side by having Mike train him. Walt deduces that Gus plans to eventually kill him and replace him with Jesse. He gives Jesse homemade ricin with which to poison Gus, but Jesse never goes through with it. Walt shows up at Jesse's house and tries to convince him to betray Gus, but Jesse refuses and tells Walt they are finished.

Meanwhile, Skyler buys the car wash where Walt used to work and uses it to launder his drug money. Evidence from Gale's murder leads Hank to suspect that Gus is involved in the blue meth business. With the DEA skeptical and Hank being unable to drive due to his condition, he enlists Walt's help in the investigation as a driver and tracker. Walt attempts to sabotage the investigation, but Gus blames him for drawing the attention of the authorities.

Gus rids himself of the Mexican cartel's influence in the area with the help of Mike and Jesse. He then fires Walt and threatens to kill Walt's entire family if he causes any more trouble. Walt tries to use one of Saul's connections to get him and his family relocated but finds that Skyler has used most of his drug money to pay off Ted Beneke's IRS fines to avoid having their own lives investigated, causing Walt to yell out in frustration and fear before breaking down into a maniacal laughing fit. After arranging for Saul to report that Hank was being targeted for assassination again so that his family would be protected by the DEA, Walt resolves to kill Gus.

When Brock, the son of Jesse's new girlfriend Andrea, falls desperately ill with ricin-like symptoms, Jesse attacks Walt, believing that he poisoned him.  Walt manages to convince Jesse that Gus is the one responsible.  After an attempt to kill Gus with a car bomb fails, Walt discovers from Saul that Gus has been visiting Tuco's uncle Hector in his nursing home, to taunt him about the cartel's defeat and the end of the Salamanca family. Walt makes a deal with Hector to draw Gus in by setting up a meeting with the DEA. When Gus comes to the nursing home to kill Hector for turning informant, Hector detonates a pipe bomb Walt made, killing himself, Gus's henchman Tyrus Kitt, and Gus. Walt rescues Jesse, who had been kept as a prisoner in the lab, and together they destroy all the evidence and torch the lab.

After Brock recovers, Jesse learns that the boy had likely been poisoned by accidentally eating lily of the valley berries, not ricin. Walt responds that killing Gus was still the right thing to do. Walt calls Skyler to tell her they are safe and that he has "won", as the camera pans to a potted Lily of the Valley plant next to Walt's pool, indicating that Walt had in fact poisoned Brock to goad Jesse into action.

Season 5 

Mike intends to kill Walt in retaliation for Gus' death, but Jesse intervenes and convinces the two men to work together to eliminate their connection to the destroyed lab. The three eventually start a new meth production system with the help of a corrupt pest control company, using residents' homes to cook meth while they are fumigated, using methylamine provided by Lydia Rodarte-Quayle (Laura Fraser), a representative for the conglomerate that owned Gus's chicken franchise. When her supply is discovered to be tracked by the police, she leaks them information on a train carrying the chemical so they can plan a robbery. The robbery is successful, but Todd Alquist (Jesse Plemons), one of the pest control workers, kills a young boy who had seen them. Horrified, Jesse and Mike resolve to leave the business. A Phoenix drug lord named Declan offers to buy out the operation for $15 million in order to remove his competition. Walt convinces him to pay off Jesse and Mike and begin distributing Walt's meth instead.

Hank connects Mike to the blue meth and begins pressing several of his associates, who are now in prison, to give information on the blue meth operation.  When Walt delivers Mike's share of Declan's payment, Mike refuses to reveal these prisoners' identities and insults Walt, blaming him for all the problems they've encountered; Walt shoots him dead in a fit of rage. Obtaining a list of the prisoners from Lydia, he enlists Todd's uncle Jack Welker (Michael Bowen), a criminal with ties to the Aryan Brotherhood prison gang, to kill the nine men simultaneously at multiple prisons to prevent the DEA from realizing that they were being targeted until it was too late.

After a few months, Walt has earned more than $80 million from meth, and Skyler convinces him to stop. Walter leaves the meth business, and the kids return home. During a family barbecue, Hank finds a copy of Walt Whitman's Leaves of Grass in the bathroom, the same copy given to Walt by Gale; upon reading Gale's handwritten inscription referring to Walt as "the other W.W." Hank realizes that Walt is the drug lord he has been pursuing. Enraged, Hank accuses Walt of being Heisenberg, which a stunned Walt neither confirms nor denies. Walt says that his cancer is back and he will likely be dead in six months, making an arrest pointless. He also tells Hank how he 'will never see the inside of a prison cell'. Hank says they can talk if Walt gives up his children, but Walt refuses and tells Hank to "tread lightly". Walt eventually forces Hank to remain silent by crafting a fake confessional videotape in which he states that Hank is Heisenberg.

Walt buries his money in seven barrels on the Tohajiilee Indian Reservation and convinces Jesse to go into a relocation program. While waiting to be picked up, Jesse figures out that Walt poisoned Brock. Hank approaches Jesse and offers to help bring down Walt. With Hank's help, Jesse lures Walt into a trap by claiming to have found his money. Walt makes arrangements with Jack and his men to kill Jesse, in exchange for promising to help teach Todd how to cook meth. When Walt realizes Jesse is with Hank, he tries to call off the deal to protect Hank but is subdued by Hank and his DEA partner Steven Gomez (Steven Michael Quezada). Just then, Jack and his men arrive and fire on the group, killing Gomez and wounding Hank; Jack then executes Hank, despite Walt pleading for his brother-in-law's life. Jack's men take all but one barrel of Walt's money and abduct Jesse; as Jesse is taken away, Walt spitefully tells him that he watched Jane die.

Walt tries to persuade Skyler and Walter Jr. to go on the run with him, but they refuse. He kidnaps Holly, but has a moment of conscience and leaves her to be found and returned. He calls Skyler, knowing that the police are listening in, and berates her for failing to follow his orders, as a way of clearing her of involvement in his crimes. Walt then goes into hiding, along with Saul, waiting for Ed the disappearer to set up a new identity for Walt. A scene in the final Better Call Saul episode "Saul Gone" shows Walt accusing Saul of always being a con artist and having no trust in him anymore. Eventually, Ed helps to set up Walt to live in isolation in New Hampshire.

After several months alone, Walt goes to a local bar, where he calls Walter Jr. and tries to give him money. Walter Jr. angrily rejects the gesture, however, and hangs up. Feeling hopeless, Walt calls the DEA and gives himself up. As he waits for them, however, he sees Gretchen and Elliott on Charlie Rose downplaying his contributions to Gray Matter and resolves to return to Albuquerque to put things right.

When Walter arrives in Albuquerque – on his 52nd birthday – he confronts Gretchen and Elliott at their home and coerces them into putting his remaining money into a trust fund for Walter Jr. He then visits Skyler and provides her with the location of Hank and Steve's unmarked grave which he suggests she use to barter for a deal with the prosecutor, and finally admits to her that he entered the meth business for himself, not his family. As a token of appreciation, Skyler lets him see his daughter, Holly, one last time. He then arranges to see Lydia, surreptitiously poisoning her drink with ricin after learning where Jack has taken Jesse. Walt drives to Jack's compound and demands to see Jesse. When they bring Jesse, who has been chained up in a lab and forced to cook meth since his abduction, Walt dives atop him and knocks them both to the ground. Now out of range, he activates a remote machine gun mounted in his car that injures Jack and kills all of his men except for Todd. Jesse strangles Todd with a chain, killing him. Noticing Jack is still alive, Walt picks up a pistol and aims it at him. Jack pleads with Walt to let him live, offering him extremely large amounts of money. Jack's pleas fall on deaf ears, and Walt executes him with a shot to the face. Walt then asks Jesse to kill him, but Jesse tells him to do it himself. Walt then finds that he has been wounded by a ricocheted bullet. He answers a call from Lydia on Todd's phone and coldly informs her that she is going to die as a result of the poisoned drink she consumed. He exchanges a knowing nod with Jesse, who escapes the compound. Walt calmly walks around Jack's lab and admires all the equipment that Jesse had been using. He notices on a dial that Jesse has cooked a perfect batch of his product, and smiles to himself. As the police arrive, Walt collapses to the floor and dies with a look of contentedness on his face, fulfilling his comment to Hank that he will never see the inside of a prison cell.

El Camino 

Cranston reprises his role in the movie El Camino: A Breaking Bad Movie in a flashback scene, taking place during the events of the episode "4 Days Out" from the show's second season. Walt and Jesse are sitting down at a buffet breakfast talking about how they are going to move a batch of recently cooked meth. Walt asks Jesse what he would like to study if he went to college and encourages Jesse to find a life outside of cooking meth in the future. He suggests that Jesse should study business and marketing, remarking that Jesse is a natural at it and that he "could practically teach the class" himself using his vast knowledge. Afterward, Walt tells Jesse: "You're really lucky, you know that? You didn't have to wait your whole life to do something special."

In the present, Jesse, Skinny Pete, and Badger see various news reports on the aftermath of Walt's massacre. In a news report Jesse listens to, Walt is confirmed to be dead with the same report mentioning an investigation of a Houston woman poisoned by Walt – presumably Lydia – who is in critical condition and not expected to survive.

Post Breaking Bad 

Walt is briefly mentioned in passing by Saul Goodman (now going by the alias Gene Takavic) as he attempts to explain to Jeff how crazy his life had become and how much money he could get by getting into "the game".

Francesca Liddy later tells Saul that Walt's death only made things worse for the surviving low-level players connected to his meth empire rather than better. As Walt had hoped, Skyler had succeeded in getting a deal with the federal prosecutors and the DEA was ultimately forced to release Huell Babineaux, leaving only Jesse and Saul left for them to go after. Although Jesse has successfully managed to escape to Alaska while tricking the public into thinking he fled to Mexico, the DEA has seized all of Saul's assets and is even following Francesca in an attempt to find him. Francesca admits that she doesn't know what's become of Patrick Kuby, another one of Walt's associates and she does not answer Saul's questions about Ira and Danny.

Saul is eventually discovered and taken by DEA agents. During their initial questioning, they bring in Marie, who is bitter at Saul for enabling Walter and leading to Hank's death. Saul shrewdly asserts he was also manipulated by Walt to goad the agent to start a plea bargain for a significantly reduced sentence until Saul learns that his involvement with Howard Hamlin's death was already given to them by Kim Wexler.

Reception

Critical response
The character development of Walter White, as well as Bryan Cranston's performance, has received universal acclaim, from both critics and audiences. Walter White is considered to be one of the greatest and most iconic characters in television history.

From TheGuardian.com, Paul MacInnes lauded Walter White's character as a whole, noting his quick transformation into becoming Heisenberg. From the same website, Rebecca Nicholson wrote about Walt's death, praising the fact that instead of facing the consequences, "Walter dies happy. He doesn't only get what he deserved; he gets what he wanted. It's the same for us viewers: we get the neatness and the uncertainty, which shows a Heisenberg level of mastery." In their list for the "Top 100 Villains", IGN ranked Walt as #12, stating that "Walter White is selfishness incarnate, and perhaps one of the greatest tragic figures to ever grace television, making his ultimate descent into villainy that much more compelling."

The web magazine Grantland quotes Andy Greenwald as analyzing Walter White differently from some others, including Vince Gilligan. Greenwald states:

Similarly, Scott Meslow wrote in The Atlantic that Walt's capacity for villainy was present well before the series even began, and that cancer was only the catalyst, stating that "all the elements that have since turned him into a monster were already in place." New York magazine writer Emma Rosenblum said Bryan Cranston "pulls off the unassuming White with flawless subtlety: a waxy pallor, a slump of the shoulders, and a sense of doom that is palpable". The Hollywood Reporter writer Tim Goodman praised as courageous Vince Gilligan's decision to transform Walter White into an unsympathetic character: "You don't take your main character and make him unlikable. You just don't. Nobody does that. Nobody has ever really done that to this extent." Robert Bianco of USA Today called Walt "one of the greatest dramatic creations ever to grace our TV screens". In 2011, The New York Times named Cranston as one of the "eight actors who turn television into art". Following the show's conclusion, actor Anthony Hopkins wrote a fan letter to Cranston, in which he praised the show and called Cranston's performance as Walter White the best acting he had ever seen.

Accolades 

Cranston has received various awards and nominations for his performance as Walter White. For the first three seasons, he won the Primetime Emmy Award for Outstanding Lead Actor in a Drama Series thrice consecutively, becoming the first actor to accomplish this feat since Bill Cosby for I Spy. Cranston was also nominated in 2012 and 2013 for season four and the first half of season five, but lost out to Damian Lewis for Homeland and Jeff Daniels for The Newsroom, respectively. He also won his fourth Primetime Emmy Award for Outstanding Lead Actor in a Drama Series, at the 66th Primetime Emmy Awards.

At the annual Golden Globe Awards, Cranston has been nominated for the Best Actor – Television Series Drama accolade on four occasions for his role in Breaking Bad, in 2011, 2012, 2013 and 2014, winning in 2014 for the second half of season five. At the Screen Actors Guild Awards, Cranston has been nominated for Male Actor in a Drama Series five times, in 2010, 2011, 2012, 2013 and 2014, winning in 2013 and 2014, for both parts of season five. Additionally, Cranston has been nominated with the rest of the cast for Performance by an Ensemble in a Drama Series, in 2012, 2013 and 2014, winning only in 2014.

In addition, Cranston has won the Satellite Award for Best Actor: Drama Series three times consecutively, in 2008, 2009 and 2010, for seasons one, two and three, and has been nominated in 2011, 2012 and 2014 for seasons four and five. He won the TCA Award for Individual Achievement in Drama in 2009, and was nominated in 2010, 2012 and 2013; was nominated twice for the Prism Award for Best Performance in a Drama Series Multi-Episode Storyline; won two Saturn Awards for Best Actor on Television in 2012 and 2013 (tying with Kevin Bacon for The Following on the latter occasion), and was nominated in 2009, 2010 and 2011; and won the Golden Nymph Award for Outstanding Actor in a Drama Series in 2013.

Legacy

Cult following 

Over time Walter White developed a cult following, spawning fan websites like "Heisenberg Labs", "Walt's Wardrobe", and "Save Walter White" (an exact replica of the website Walter White's son creates in the series to raise money to pay for his father's cancer treatments). In 2015, series creator Vince Gilligan publicly requested fans of the series to stop reenacting a scene in which Walt angrily throws a pizza on his roof after Skyler refuses to let him inside; this came after complaints from the home's real-life owner. Cranston reprised his role of the character in a commercial for Esurance which aired during Super Bowl XLIX, one week before the premiere of Breaking Bad spin-off Better Call Saul. In December 2016, Bryan cameoed as White in an episode of Saturday Night Live in the cold open. The skit had White on a CNN broadcast where he is the front runner for Donald Trump’s cabinet nominee for the Drug Enforcement Administration. In 2023, Cranston again reprised his role in an ad for snack company PopCorners during Super Bowl LVII. In the Spanish-language remake of Breaking Bad, titled Metástasis, his character is renamed Walter Blanco (blanco being the Spanish translation of white) and is portrayed by Diego Trujillo.

Albuquerque statues
Bronze statues of White and Jesse Pinkman were commissioned and donated by creator Vince Gilligan and Sony Television Pictures to the city of Albuquerque in July 2022, which will be housed in the Albuquerque Convention Center. They were made by former sculptor Trevor Grove.

Obituary and funeral 
A Breaking Bad fan group placed a paid obituary for Walter White in the Albuquerque Journal on October 4, 2013. On October 19, 2013, actor Jackamoe Buzzell organized a mock funeral procession (including a hearse and a replica of Walt's meth lab RV) and service for the character was held at Albuquerque's Sunset Memorial Park cemetery. A headstone was placed with a photo of Cranston as Walt, located on an outside wall in Los Ranchos de Albuquerque, New Mexico. While some residents were unhappy with the makeshift grave-site for closure with the show, tickets for the event raised over $30,000 for a local charity called Albuquerque Healthcare for the Homeless.

Alternative theory concerning death 
Many fans of Breaking Bad, including actor Norm Macdonald and New Yorker magazine writer Emily Nussbaum, proposed a theory, in which most of the series finale happened in Walt's mind, and he really died in the stolen Volvo in the beginning of it. While Nussbaum merely stated that it would be her preferred ending, Macdonald emphasized the seemingly unreal scenarios of Walt's final day, as well as what he deemed as unreliable acting. However, series creator Vince Gilligan debunked this theory, explaining that Walt could not possibly have known several things that happened, like Jesse being held in captivity by Jack's gang instead of being murdered by them, or that Todd had begun taking meetings with Lydia regarding the meth trade. This theory was further disproven with Better Call Saul following Saul’s story before and after Breaking Bad alongside El Camino: A Breaking Bad Movie following Jesse's story after the finale, in which White is confirmed to have died.

References

Further reading 
 
 VICE – The Real Walter White

External links 
 Walter White at AMC.com

Breaking Bad characters
Better Call Saul characters
American male characters in television
Fictional American scientists and engineers
Fictional blackmailers
Fictional California Institute of Technology people
Fictional characters from Los Angeles County, California
Fictional characters from New Mexico
Fictional characters with cancer
Fictional characters with personality disorders
Fictional characters with respiratory diseases
Fictional chemical engineers
Fictional chemists
Fictional crime bosses
Fictional drug dealers
Fictional fugitives
Fictional mad scientists
Fictional mass murderers
Fictional money launderers
Fictional Sandia National Laboratories people
Fictional schoolteachers
Fictional scientists in television
Film and television memes
Internet memes
Male characters in film
Male villains
Narcissism in television
Television characters introduced in 2008